Ulotrichopus eugeniae is a moth of the  family Erebidae. It is found in Kenya and Tanzania.

References

Moths described in 2010
Ulotrichopus
Moths of Africa